Dushan Ruzic (born 5 January 1982) is an Australian former professional baseball pitcher. He was signed professionally by the Cincinnati Reds, Toronto Blue Jays and the Florida Marlins. He has also played for Rotterdam Neptunus of the Honkbal Hoofdklasse (Dutch Major League Baseball), and Rimini of the Italian Baseball League. He has played for the Adelaide Bite, Melbourne Aces, and Canberra Cavalry of the Australian Baseball League.

Career
Ruzic played for the Gulf Coast Marlins in 2005. He played for the Sarasota Reds and Chattanooga Lookouts in 2007. He played in the Honkbal Hoofdklasse for the DOOR Neptunus from 2008 through 2010. He also played for the Adelaide Bite of the Australian Baseball League in 2010 and 2011. Ruzic played for the Telemarket Rimini of the Italian Baseball League in 2011.

International career
Ruzic competed for the Australia national baseball team in the 2009 Baseball World Cup, 2013 World Baseball Classic, 2017 World Baseball Classic and 2019 WBSC Premier12.

References

External links

1982 births
Living people
Adelaide Bite players
Australian people of Serbian descent
Australian expatriate baseball players in Italy
Australian expatriate baseball players in the Netherlands
Australian expatriate baseball players in the United States
Baseball pitchers
Chattanooga Lookouts players
DOOR Neptunus players
Gulf Coast Marlins players
Sarasota Reds players
Sportspeople from Darwin, Northern Territory
Rimini Baseball Club players
2013 World Baseball Classic players
2017 World Baseball Classic players